Apsey Beach is a fishing settlement of the Bay of Islands on the north side of Humber Arm in the St. George District in the Canadian province of Newfoundland and Labrador.

See also
List of communities in Newfoundland and Labrador

References

Populated places in Newfoundland and Labrador